The Parapower is a Polish paramotor designed and produced by Parapower of Pilchowo for powered paragliding. The aircraft is supplied complete and ready-to-fly.

Confusingly, both the manufacturer and its product have the same name.

Design and development
The Parapower was designed to comply with the US FAR 103 Ultralight Vehicles rules as well as European regulations. It features a paraglider-style wing, single-place accommodation and a single Solo 210 engine in pusher configuration with a reduction drive and a  diameter two-bladed composite propeller, depending on the model. The aircraft is built from a combination of bolted aluminium and 4130 steel tubing, with the plastic fuel tank mounted above the engine.

As is the case with all paramotors, take-off and landing is accomplished by foot. Inflight steering is accomplished via handles that actuate the canopy brakes, creating roll and yaw.

Reviewer Rene Coulon noted in 2003, "the chassis, although of classic design, is robust and of good quality. The price is very competitive."

Variants
Parapower
Model with a  Solo 210 engine in pusher configuration with a 2:1 ratio reduction drive and a  diameter two-bladed composite propeller.
Parapower Full
Model with a  Solo 210 engine in pusher configuration with a 2.5:1 ratio reduction drive and a  diameter two-bladed composite propeller.

Specifications (Parapower Full)

References

External links

Video of the Parapower

Parapower
2000s Polish ultralight aircraft
Single-engined pusher aircraft
Paramotors